The 1960 Purdue Boilermakers football team was an American football team that represented Purdue University during the 1960 Big Ten Conference football season. In their fifth season under head coach Jack Mollenkopf, the Boilermakers compiled a 4–4–1 record, finished in a four-way tie for fifth place in the Big Ten Conference with a 3–4 record against conference opponents, and outscored all opponents by a combined total of 212 to 163.

Schedule

Personnel

Game summaries

Notre Dame

Source: Palm Beach Post. 1960 Oct 02.

Indiana
Willie Jones 25 rushes, 111 yards

References

Purdue
Purdue Boilermakers football seasons
Purdue Boilermakers football